Paadrema is a village in Lääneranna Parish, Pärnu County, in southwestern Estonia. It had a population of 37 on 1 January 2011.

Paadremaa is the birthplace of wrestler Mihkel Müller (1887–1970).

References

Villages in Pärnu County
Kreis Wiek